Jersey Devil is a 3D platformer developed by Behaviour Interactive and released worldwide for the PlayStation and Windows. The titular protagonist is a Jersey Devil, although he has more characteristics of a bat. His primary mission is to stop Dr. Knarf and his army of mutated vegetables and prehistoric monsters. Jersey Devil uses his punch, jumping, and gliding abilities to defeat his enemies. In many areas of the game, it is necessary to collect all five letters of Knarf's name to proceed, adding a puzzle element to the gameplay.

Gameplay 
Jersey Devil is a platform game set in a 3D world, with gameplay dominated by collecting icons and defeating enemies. The player character's abilities include gliding in order to get out of fatal falls or reach new areas.

Plot 
Dennis, a mutated, humanoid pumpkin, enters Dr. Knarf's lab with something he found in a small cage. He interrupts Knarf as he is about to dissect a mutant eggplant in order to show him the creature he had found.  In the cage is shown to be the main character, Jersey Devil, as an infant. Knarf begins plans to dissect the infant in order to study him, but realizes that when Dennis interrupted him earlier, he ruined his last scalpel blade and locks Dennis in a cage outside before leaving to fetch more. While gone, one of his plant monsters tries to attack the infant Jersey Devil, but he eludes it and then begins to wreck the lab while Dennis watches helplessly from his cage. Knarf returns to find his lab in ruins with the Jersey Devil holding a bottle of Nitroglycerin, which he dangles in the air before suddenly dropping it and destroying the lab almost completely, the result of which sends him flying far away into the middle of the nearby town of "Jersey".

The cutscene then flashes forward to many years later, the town has grown into a city, and mutant vegetable monsters are seen chasing, terrorizing and kidnapping the residents of the city. One of them stops while passing by a television store window, which is playing the evening news, and watches curiously as Dr. Knarf is mentioned. The news then goes on to mention "mysterious sightings of the legendary Jersey Devil", as a figure suddenly appears behind the mutant and pulls of the mask he is wearing, revealing him to be Dennis.  The figure, revealed to be Jersey Devil, leans down and says "Boo!" scaring Dennis away, when he picked up by Knarf as he drives past in his car. The scene then pans back towards Jersey Devil, finding instead only empty streets, before revealing Jersey Devil up on the rooftops, looking down over the city as the title screen appears.

Development
Sony Computer Entertainment America picked up the title in October 1997.

Reception 

Next Generation reviewed the PlayStation version of the game, rating it three stars out of five, and stated that "it's not a bad game, just tiresome in a 'seen it all before' kind of way. Anyone looking for something fresh for PlayStation's stale platform genre probably won't be that happy with this game."

The game received mixed reviews; criticism was mainly focused on the camera and graphics. A common praise given to the game was its orchestral score by Gilles Léveillé.

Footnotes 
 Notes

 References

External links
Artificial Mind & Movement page

1997 video games
3D platform games
Behaviour Interactive games
Halloween video games
Jersey Devil in fiction
Ocean Software games
Konami games
Infogrames games
PlayStation (console) games
Sony Interactive Entertainment games
Video games developed in Canada
Windows games
Single-player video games